Crataegus tanacetifolia, the tansy-leaved thorn, is a species of hawthorn. It is native to Turkey where it occurs on dry slopes or in rocky places, usually on calcareous rocks.

It is a deciduous tree that grows up to 10 metres in height and 8 metres in width The fruit, is 10–14 mm or up to 25 mm in diameter, orange or rarely red in colour. It can be consumed fresh or cooked.

See also
 List of hawthorn species with yellow fruit

References

tanacetifolia
Edible fruits